Hilkka is the given name of the following people:

Hilkka Kemppi (born 1988), Finnish politician
Hilkka Nenonen, Finnish diplomat
Hilkka Rantaseppä-Helenius (1925–1975), Finnish astronomer
Hilkka Riihivuori (born 1952), Finnish cross-country skier
Hilkka Toivola (1909–2002), Finnish artist
Hilkka Vahervuori (born 1942), Finnish long track speed skater

Finnish feminine given names